Salon is an American politically progressive/liberal news and opinion website created in 1995. It publishes articles on U.S. politics, culture, and current events.

Content and coverage 
Salon covers a variety of topics, including reviews and articles about books, films, and music; articles about "modern life", including friendships, human sexual behavior, and relationships; and reviews and articles about technology, with a particular focus on the free and open-source software (FOSS) movement.

According to the senior contributing writer for the American Journalism Review, Paul Farhi, Salon offers "provocative (if predictably liberal) political commentary and lots of sex."

In 2008, Salon launched the interactive initiative Open Salon, a social content site/blog network for its readers. Originally a curated site with some of its content being featured on Salon, it fell into editorial neglect and was closed in March 2015.

Responding to the question, "How far do you go with the tabloid sensibility to get readers?," former Salon.com editor-in-chief David Talbot said:

Staff and contributors 

Salon.com, originally salon1999.com, was founded in 1995 by David Talbot, Gary Kamiya, Andrew Ross, Mignon Khargie, Scott Rosenberg, and Laura Miller.

Regular contributors have included the political-opinion writers Amanda Marcotte, Scott Eric Kaufman, Heather Digby Parton and Sean Illing, critic Andrew O'Hehir and pop-culture columnist Mary Elizabeth Williams.

David Talbot, founder and original editor-in-chief, also served several stints as CEO, most recently replacing Richard Gingras, who left to join Google as head of news products in July 2011. Joan Walsh was the second editor-in-chief, serving in that role starting in 2005. She stepped down as editor-in-chief in November 2010 and was replaced by Kerry Lauerman. David Daley took over the editor-in-chief position in June 2013.

Jordan Hoffner took over as CEO in May 2016, also serving as editor-in-chief. He resigned in May 2019, and was succeeded as editor-in-chief by Erin Keane.

As of September 2021, Salon's CEO was Chris Richmond, and its editor-in-chief was Erin Keane.

History 
Salon was created in the wake of the San Francisco newspaper strike of 1994, by former San Francisco Examiner arts and features editor David Talbot who wished to explore the potential of Web. It launched as salonmag.com in November 1995. In its early days, readers noticed a specifically Northern California flavor. In 1996, Talbot agreed: "We swim in the soup of San Francisco. There are a lot of odd fish we've plucked out of the bay here and it gives us some of that Left Coast, Weird Coast style." Time magazine named it one of the Best Web Sites of 1996.

Salon purchased the virtual community The WELL in April 1999 (switching to its current URL, salon.com, at roughly that time), and made its initial public offering (IPO) of Salon.com on the NASDAQ stock exchange on June 22 of that year. Subsequently, for the month of October 1999, Nielsen/NetRatings reported that Salon had over 2 million users.

Salon Premium, a pay-to-view (online) content subscription was introduced on April 25, 2001. The service signed up 130,000 subscribers and staved off discontinuation of services. However, in November 2002, the company announced it had accumulated cash and non-cash losses of $80 million, and by February 2003 it was having difficulty paying its rent and made an appeal for donations to keep the company running.

On October 9, 2003, Michael O'Donnell, the chief executive and president of Salon Media Group, said he was leaving the company after seven years because it was "time for a change." When he left, Salon.com had accrued $83.6 million in losses since its inception, and its stock traded for 5¢ on the OTC Bulletin Board. David Talbot, Salon's chairman and editor-in-chief at the time, became the new chief executive. Elizabeth "Betsy" Hambrecht, then Salon's chief financial officer, became the president.

In July 2008, Salon launched Open Salon, a "social content site" and "curated blog network." It was nominated for a 2009 National Magazine Award in the category "best interactive feature." On March 9, 2015, Salon announced it would be closing Open Salon after six years of hosting a community of writers and bloggers.

Salon closed its online chat board "Table Talk" on June 10, 2011, without stating an official reason for ending that section of the site.

On July 16, 2012, Salon announced that it would be featuring content from Mondoweiss.

Salon Media Group sold The WELL to the group of members in September 2012.

Business model and operations 
Salon has been unprofitable through its entire history. Since 2007, the company has been dependent upon repeated cash injections from board Chairman John Warnock and William Hambrecht, father of former Salon CEO Elizabeth Hambrecht. During the nine months ending on December 31, 2012, these cash contributions amounted to $3.4 million, compared to revenue in the same period of $2.7 million. In December 2016 and January 2017, the company was evicted from its New York offices at 132 West 31st Street, a block from Madison Square Garden, for non-payment of $90,000 in back rent. In February 2017, Spear Point Capital invested $1 million into Salon, taking a 29% equity stake and three seats on the company's board. On August 30, 2019, Salon.com was sold for $5 million by Salon Media Group to privately held Salon.com, LLC, which is owned by Chris Richmond and Drew Schoentrup.

Aspects of the Salon.com site offerings, ordered by advancing date:

 Free content: around 15 new articles posted per-day, revenues wholly derived from in-page advertisements.
 Per-day new content was reduced for a time.
 Salon Premium subscription: Approximately 20 percent of new content was made available to subscribers only. Other subscription benefits included free magazines and ad-free viewing. Larger, more conspicuous ad units were introduced for non-subscribers.
 A hybrid subscription model: Readers can now read content by viewing a 15-second full screen advertisement to earn a "day pass" or gain access by subscribing to Salon Premium.
 Salon Core: After Salon Premium subscriptions declined from about 100,000 to 10,000, it was rebranded in 2011 as Salon Core subscriptions featuring a different mix of benefits.
 In 2018, Salon launched a beta program allowing customers to opt out of advertising in exchange for mining cryptocurrency.

Controversies

Retracted article on vaccine conference 

An article called "Deadly Immunity" written by Robert F. Kennedy Jr. appeared on the Salon and simultaneously in the July 14, 2005 issue of Rolling Stone. The article focused on the 2000 Simpsonwood CDC conference and claimed that thimerosal-containing vaccines caused autism, as well as the conspiracy theory that government health agencies have "colluded with Big Pharma to hide the risks of thimerosal from the public." The article was retracted by Salon on January 16, 2011, in response to criticisms of the article as inaccurate.

Otto Warmbier 
In March 2016, while American tourist Otto Warmbier was imprisoned in North Korea for allegedly trying to steal a propaganda poster there, the site posted an article about him headed: "This might be America's biggest idiot frat boy: Meet the UVa student who thought he could pull a prank in North Korea." After Warmbier's death, the article was removed. Andrew O'Hehir, the executive editor of Salon, said the article was a summary of the opinions of television comedian Larry Wilmore.

Todd Nickerson 
In September 2015, Salon published an article written by Todd Nickerson, moderator of Virtuous Pedophiles, about his experiences with being a non-offending pedophile, titled: "I'm a pedophile, but not a monster." This caused controversy at the time, with some commentators accusing it of being "pro-pedophile" (in the sense of being pro-child sexual abuse) and Nickerson himself subject to a "backlash." This article, along with an accompanying video and a follow-up article, was deleted in early 2017.  Some saw a connection between the removal of the articles and the controversy surrounding Milo Yiannopoulos's remarks on child sexual abuse that emerged in February 2017, although Salon Media Group CEO and Salon acting editor-in-chief Jordan Hoffner told New York magazine that they had been removed in January 2017 due to unspecified "new editorial policies."  A third article by sex researcher Debra Soh defending Nickerson's side is still published as of April 2022.

Cryptocurrency mining 

In February 2018, it was noted that Salon was preventing readers using ad blockers from seeing its content. Such users are offered a choice of disabling their blocker, or allowing Salon to run an in-browser script, using the user's resources, to mine Monero, a form of cryptocurrency.

Ron DeSantis headline 
On June 23, 2021, Salon published an article with a headline falsely claiming that a bill signed by Florida Governor Ron DeSantis would force Florida students and professors to register their political views with the state of Florida. The article went viral on Twitter and its false claim was promoted by various Democratic commentators, by Florida Commissioner of Agriculture Nikki Fried (who later deleted her tweet linking to the Salon article), and by novelist Stephen King (who later expressed regret for posting the headline). In 2022, Salon executive editor Andrew O'Hehir said that Salon had recently concluded that the headline "conveyed a misleading impression of what the Florida law actually said, and did not live up to our editorial standards," and the headline was changed. Another Salon editor had initially defended the headline in 2021. DeSantis spokesperson Christina Pushaw said that her colleagues had tried unsuccessfully to get Salon to change the headline in 2021, adding that "It's good to see that Salon finally changed its false headline after the pushback they received yesterday. It should have happened much sooner. Better yet, the Salon reporter and editors should have read the legislation before writing an article about it (a good practice for journalism, in general!)."

References

External links 
 

1995 establishments in California
Internet properties established in 1995
American news websites
Online magazines published in the United States
American political websites
Webby Award winners
Companies based in San Francisco
Liberalism in the United States